The girls' singles luge at the 2012 Winter Youth  Olympics took place on 16 January at the Olympic Sliding Centre Innsbruck.

Results
The first run was held at 14:00 and the second run at 15:35.

References

Girls' singles